Solar Ray (stylized and subtitled as SOLAR RAY Hirasawa best recycling album Recycled by P-MODEL kernel) is a 2001 remix album by Susumu Hirasawa. It is the centerpiece of "Hirasawa Energy Works", a project to produce music in an ecologically friendly way.

Overview
In 2000, Hirasawa switched from a gasoline-powered car to a hybrid electric, developing an interest in sustainable energy, specifically in the idea of using solar power to make music. He purchased two 120-watt solar panels, outfitted his home studio to be powered by them, and connected two car batteries to store additional energy, which combined allowed Hirasawa to work for 12 hours. To further optimize the work hours and prepare for bad weather days, only equipment necessary for work was ever kept on. The studio was illuminated by less than 30 small low wattage blue LEDs. Hirasawa's workdays ended when there was no more energy remaining. In total, less than 7 kg of carbon dioxide were emitted during the making of the album.

Solar Ray features remixes of songs from previous albums in the energetic technopop style of Hirasawa's former band, P-Model.

Track listing

Personnel
Susumu Hirasawa - Vocals, Electric guitars, Synthesizers, Sampler, Amiga/Laptop, Sequencer, Programming, Production
Sadatoshi Tainaka - Drums (sampled) on "AURORA 2"
Miss N. & Wisakha Fraytes - Vocals (sampled) on "Sim City 2"
Tuan Chin Kuan - Vocals (sampled) on "World Turbine"
Masanori Chinzei - Engineering

References

External links
 Music Samples from SOLAR RAY
 Hirasawa Energy Works
 D
 Audio File to Honor the Hunters
 
 
 

Susumu Hirasawa albums
Japanese-language albums
2001 remix albums
Self-released albums